is a Japanese light novel series written by Hiro Ainana. It began serialization online in 2013 on the user-generated novel publishing website Shōsetsuka ni Narō until it was acquired by Fujimi Shobo. The first volume of the Light Novel was published in March 2014. A manga adaptation by Ayamegumu ran in Age Premium until the magazine ceased publication, and was then transferred to Monthly Dragon Age. Both the light novels and the manga adaptation have been licensed for publication in North America by Yen Press. An anime television series adaptation by Silver Link and Connect aired from January 11 to March 29, 2018.

Plot
Ichiro Suzuki is a 29-year old game programmer who was tasked with fixing several bugs in two MMORPGs his company is preparing for publication. However, he becomes extremely worn out as he is working during the weekend. After taking a nap, he mysteriously wakes up in a parallel world that resembles some of the fantasy RPG worlds he had worked on, as a 15-year old named Satou, later Satou Pendragon, a nickname he uses while running beta tests, and with what looks like the menu screen of the game he was working on appearing before his inner eye.

However, before he can grasp his current situation, an army of lizardmen ambushes him and launches an all-out attack on him. In desperation, he uses all three of his special 'Meteor Rain' attack options (a quick fix he added to the game for new players which kills all enemies in the vicinity) at once and wipes them all out - accidentally killing a god as well. As a result, his level jumps from 1 to 310, maximizing his stats immensely and making him one of the most powerful people in the world. With no way to return to his world, and as a high-leveled adventurer armed with a myriad of different physical, cognitive and magical abilities and weapons, he sets out to uncover the secrets of this new world, earning the trust and affection of many people in the process while keeping his overpowered stats concealed.

Characters
 / 

Ichirou is a 29-year old game programmer who is transferred to another world, where he finds himself in a 15-year old body. His new name is based on "Satoo", a character he created to test games. Using all three of the special Meteor Shower items in his possession, Satou wipes out a massive hostile force composed of high-level lizardmen, which increases his level from 1 to 310 instantly and grants him an immense pool of skill points. He also gains a huge amount of money and a vast number of valuable items. Upon arriving in Seiryuu, Satou pretends to be a young merchant and acquires new documents in which he hides his true level. Rather than be tied down to any one place, Satou wants to explore the world and try to understand how he arrived in the other world. He typically arms himself with magic pistols and short swords, but uses high level weapons while in disguise.

A 17-year-old mage soldier who becomes Satou's first friend in the other world. She joined the military to avoid being married to a noble by her parents, but seems to be comfortable around Satou. She is friends with Iona, Lilio, and Ruu. She is determined to join Satou after her term of military service ends.

Originally called Dog, she is a 10-year-old dog demi-human turned slave until Satou rescues her from a dungeon, and who has travelled with him since then. She wields a short sword and buckler.

Originally called Cat, Tama is a 10-year-old child cat demi-human slave whom Satou rescued along with Pochi and Liza. An energetic person, she fights using dual knives. She was age 10 at the debut of the show and is currently 12.

Liza is an 18-year-old orange scale lizardkin demi-human slave, who looked after Pochi and Tama. Her name is a shortened form of her original name, which is too difficult for humans to pronounce; it is not derived from lizard, although her former owner referred to her as Lizard. She was rescued by Satou and joins his party. Liza's favourite weapon is the spear that Satou made for her from a monster's claw.

Arisa is an 11-year-old fallen princess who was enslaved after her country was invaded and her parents executed. Satou bought her when he discovered that she understands Japanese. She actually is a Japanese woman formerly named Arisa Tachibana, who died on Earth and was reincarnated in the other world, and is therefore much more mature than the other girls in Satou's party despite her young age. Along with Lulu, she is under a geas that prevents her slave status being revoked. She initially specializes in psychic magic. The menu system she uses differs from Satou's in that it is more limited; her inventory has limited space and does not keep items in stasis. Despite her age, she sees Satou as her ideal man.

A 14-year-old slave whose great-grandfather was Japanese. Despite Satou considering her beautiful by Japanese standards, her black hair and Asian features are considered unattractive by humans of the current world. Satou purchased her along with Arisa. Satou asks her to teach him to drive a wagon after he learns that she was taught to drive carriages during her slavery.

Also known as Mia, she is a 130 year old juvenile Elf with magical abilities whom Satou rescued when she was kidnapped as part of Undead King Zen's plot. She develops a crush on Satou. Mia speaks in short sentences and does not eat meat.

A homunculus in the form of a comely human female, who was created by the undead sorcerer, Zen, and whom Satou rescued from the collapse of Zen's dungeon, along with her 7 identical sisters/clones. While her sisters leave on a separate mission, Nana (Japanese for her original name, "Number Seven") chooses to stay by Satou's side and to serve him. She is armed with a sword and shield and acts as the party's tank.

Iona is a soldier in Seiryuu City's territorial army, and friends with Zena, Lilio, and Ruu. She wears plate armor and wields a bastard sword.

Lilio is a soldier in Seiryuu City's territorial army, and friends with Zena, Iona, and Ruu. Her main weapon is a crossbow.

Ruu is a soldier belonging to Seiryuu City's territorial army, and friends with Zena, Lilio, and Iona.

She is the daughter of Mosa and a waitress at the Gate Inn in Seiryuu City. Despite being only 13 years old, she looks like a mid-teenager and is very well endowed.

Mosa is the innkeeper at the Gate Inn and Martha's mother.

A young orphaned girl who works around the Gate Inn. She became friends with Pochi and Tama and learned to read with them using Satou's picture cards.

Ohna is a Priestess at the Parion Temple in Seiryuu City who serves the goddess Parion. 

He is the Head Priest at the Zaicuon Temple in Seiryuu City. He is a sly man who attempted to trick the populace into believing that demi-humans are demons. He was killed by the demon that created the dungeon in Seiryuu City from which Satou rescued Liza, Tama, and Pochi.

He is a slave trader who was caught up in the formation of the dungeon in Seiryuu City. Satou rescued him and later bought Arisa and Lulu from him.

A human woman who works at the Odd Job shop.

Most commonly known as "Yuuya", he is manager at the Odd Job shop. Yuuya is a green-haired Elf who is a member of a subspecies of Elves with shorter ears, a difference he is very touchy about. He speaks with short sentences and is related to Mia.

He is a were rat knight and the leader of the were rat riders who is known around the kingdom as "Red Helmet." He helped Mia after she escaped from the Cradle. However, he and his group were attacked by Zen and he was severely injured, losing his ear in the process.

A monster Satou encounters in the Cradle that only requires mana and water to survive. She is able to move people between locations within the Cradle. After the Cradle is destroyed, she tells Satou that she can be found wherever there is a forest.

A powerful sorcerer turned king of the undead. Zen is a reincarnated person who was reborn into a loving noble family in the fantasy world. He was betrayed by a jealous noble, who desired his wife, which led to his death, his family's execution, and his wife's rape and death. Zen's intense desire for revenge caused him to rise as a powerful undead that avenged the deaths of his family by killing not only the noble responsible, but his entire extended family as well. The distorted story of his life in the play that Satou watches presents Zen as the villain and the noble as a hero. While Zen challenges Satou to a contest of strength and will for custody of Misanaria, his actual desire is to die at the hands of a true hero. After Satou passes the tests, he slays Zen, ending his immortal undead existence. Before he disappears, Zen warns Satou to watch over Arisa and not allow her to make the same mistakes that he did.

Media

Light novel
Hiro Ainana first published Death March to the Parallel World Rhapsody as a web novel on the user-generated content site Shōsetsuka ni Narō in 2013, before republishing it as a light novel with illustrations by shri. The first volume was released by Fujimi Shobo in March 2014. Twenty-seven volumes have been released to date. North American publisher Yen Press announced its license to the novels on May 20, 2016.

Manga
Ayamegumu began serializing a manga adaptation in Fujimi Shobo's Age Premium magazine in December 2014. Age Premium ceased publication with its 49th issue on July 9, 2016, and the manga was one of five titles that were transferred to Monthly Dragon Age. The manga has been licensed by Yen Press.

Akira Segami launched a prequel manga, titled , adapted from the short story by the same name in Death March to the Parallel World Rhapsody: Ex, in Fujimi Shobo's shōnen manga magazine Monthly Dragon Age on February 9, 2018. The manga ended on July 9, 2018.

A gourmet spin-off manga by Tsurumi, titled Death March kara Hajimaru Isekai Kōfukukyoku, began serialization in Monthly Dragon Age in the February 2022 issue released on January 8, 2022. It centers around the character, Phantom Chef Lulu.

Anime
An anime adaptation was announced via a wraparound band on the fourth volume of the manga on December 10, 2016. The television series is directed by Shin Oonuma at Silver Link and Connect with scripts written by Kento Shimoyama, while Shoko Takimoto designed the characters. MONACA composed the music at DIVE II Entertainment. The series aired from January 11 to March 29, 2018, on AT-X, with further broadcasts on Tokyo MX and BS11. It ran for 12 episodes and covers the first 3 volumes of the light novel. Crunchyroll streamed the series, while Funimation streamed an English dub.

Reception
The series was the 10th best-selling light novel series in Japan during the first half of 2018, selling 211,393 copies.

Notes

References

External links
  at Fujimi Shobo 
  at Shōsetsuka ni Narō 
  
 

2014 Japanese novels
Anime and manga based on light novels
Connect (studio)
Crunchyroll anime
Fujimi Shobo manga
Funimation
Harem anime and manga
Isekai anime and manga
Isekai novels and light novels
Kadokawa Dwango franchises
Light novels
Light novels first published online
Mass media franchises
Monarchy in fiction
Shōnen manga
Shōsetsuka ni Narō
Silver Link
Yen Press titles